Megathous nigerrimus is a species of click beetles in the family Elateridae.

Distribution
This species can be found in France, Italy and Switzerland. It is the most widespread species within the genus Megathous. It is mainly known from the French and Italian Maritime Alps, Alpes-de-Haute-Provence and Piedmont.

Description
These click beetles are entirely black, moderately shiny, including antennae and legs. They are covered with fine and not very thick pubescence. Antennae are serrated from third article. Frons is arcuate anteriorly with margin simple on level with clypeus at middle.

Biology
The larvae develop as predators in decayed trunks and stumps of different tree species. Adults have crepuscular habits.

References

External links
 INPN - Inventaire National du Patrimoine Naturel 

Elateridae